NFC may refer to:

Psychology
 Need for cognition, in psychology
 Need for closure, social psychological term

Sports
 NFC Championship Game, the National Football Conference Championship Game
 NCAA Football Championship (Philippines)
 National Football Conference, part of US National Football League
 National football centre, soccer centre in several countries

Organizations
 National Fertilizer Corporation, a state-owned enterprise in Pakistan
 National Finance Center of the US Department of Agriculture
 Nuclear Fuel Complex, a division of the Department of Atomic Energy in India
 National Finance Commission Award, a series of economic reforms in Pakistan

Other
 Near-field communication, a set of communication protocols for electronic devices
 New Friends Colony, a residential neighborhood in India
 News First Class, a news website
 No Fem el CIM, Catalan social movement
 Normalization Form Canonical Composition, one of the forms of Unicode normalization
 Norwegian Forest cat, a breed of domestic cat

See also